Jacques René Hébert (15 November 1757 – 24 March 1794) was a French journalist and the founder and editor of the extreme radical newspaper Le Père Duchesne during the French Revolution.

Hébert was a leader of the French Revolution and had thousands of followers as the Hébertists (French Hébertistes); he himself was sometimes called Père Duchesne, a name which he shared with his newspaper.

Early life

Jacques René Hébert was born on 15 November 1757 in Alençon, to goldsmith, former trial judge, and deputy consul Jacques Hébert (died 1766) and Marguerite Beunaiche de Houdrie (1727–1787).

Hébert studied law at the College of Alençon and went into practice as a clerk in a solicitor of Alençon, in which position he was ruined by a lawsuit against a Dr. Clouet. Hébert fled first to Rouen and then to Paris. For a while, he passed through a difficult financial time and lived through the support of a hairdresser in Rue des Noyers. There he found work in a theater, La République, where he wrote plays in his spare time, but these were never produced. Hébert was eventually fired for theft and entered the service of a doctor. It is said he lived through expediency and scams.

In 1789, he began his writing with a pamphlet "la Lanterne magique ou le Fléau des Aristocrates" (Magic Lantern, or Scourge of Aristocrats). He published a few booklets. In 1790, he attracted attention through a pamphlet he published, and became a prominent member of the political club of the Cordeliers in 1791.

Père Duchesne

From 1790 until his death in 1794, Hébert became a voice for the working class of Paris through his highly successful and influential journal, Le Père Duchesne.  In his journal, Hébert assumed the voice of a patriotic sans-culotte named Père Duchesne and would write first-person narratives in which Père Duchesne would often relay fictitious conversations that he had with the French monarchs or government officials. Hébert and the Hébertists often expressed the view that many more aristocrats should be examined, denounced, and executed, as they argued that Revolutionary France could only be fully reborn through the elimination of its ancient and supposedly currently malignant nobility. In Le Père Duchesne number 65, where he writes of his reawakening in 1790, he defines aristocrats as "enemies of the constitution" who "conspire against the nation," showing his animus against them. Much of Hébert's celebrity came from his denunciations of King Louis XVI in his newspaper, as opposed to any office he may have held or his roles in any of the Parisian clubs with which he was involved.

These stories encouraged violent behaviors and utilized foul and sexualized language; Père Duchesne's stories were also witty, reflective, and resonated deeply in the poorer Parisian quarters. Street hawkers would yell: Il est bougrement en colère aujourd’hui le père Duchesne! (Father Duchesne is very angry today!).

Although Hébert did not create the image of the Père Duchesne, his use of the character helped to transform the symbolic image of Père Duchesne from that of a comical stove-merchant into a patriotic role model for the sans-culottes. In part, Hébert's use of Père Duchesne as a revolutionary symbol can be seen by his appearance as a bristly old man who was portrayed as smoking a pipe and wearing a Phrygian cap.

Because he reflected both his audience's speech and dressing style, his readers listened to and followed his message. The French linguist and historian Ferdinand Brunot called Hébert "The Homer of filth"  because of his ability to use common language to appeal to general audiences. In addition, Père Duchesne's appearance played into the tensions of the revolution through the sharp contrast of his clothing and portrayal as a laborer against the crown and aristocracy's formal attire. Hébert was not the only writer during the French Revolution to use the image of Père Duchesne nor was he the only author in the period to adopt foul language as a way of appealing to the working class. Another writer at the time, Lemaire (fr), also wrote a newspaper entitled Père Duchêne (although he spelt it differently than Hébert) from September 1790 until May 1792 in which he assumed the voice of a "moderate patriot" who wanted to conserve the relationship between the King and the nation. Lemaire's character also used a slew of profanities and would address France's military. Hébert's paper, however, became far more popular. In part, this was due to the Paris Commune deciding to buy his papers and distribute them to the French military for distribution to soldiers in training. For example, starting in 1792 the Paris Commune and the ministers of war Jean-Nicolas Pache and, later, Jean Baptiste Noël Bouchotte bought several thousand copies of Le Père Duchesne which were distributed free to the public and troops. This happened again in May and June 1793 when the Minister of War bought copies of newspapers in order to "enlighten and animate their patriotism."  It is estimated that Hébert received 205,000 livres from this purchase. The death of Jean-Paul Marat on July 13, 1793 allowed Le Père Duchesne to become the incontestible best-selling paper in Paris, which also played into the number of copies bought during those months.

 

Hébert's political commentary between 1790 and 1793 focused on the lavish excesses of the monarchy. Initially, from 1790 and into 1792, Le Père Duchesne supported a constitutional monarchy and was even favorable towards King Louis XVI and the opinions of the Marquis de La Fayette. His violent attacks of the period were aimed at Jean-Sifrein Maury, a great defender of papal authority and the main opponent of the Civil Constitution of the Clergy. Although the character of Père Duchesne supported a constitutional monarchy, he was always highly critical of Marie Antoinette. Knowing that the queen was an easy target for ridicule after the Diamond Necklace Affair, she became a consistent target in the paper as a scapegoat for many of France's political problems. By identifying Marie Antoinette's lavish excesses and alleged sexuality as the core of the monarchy's problems, Hébert's articles suggested that, if Marie Antoinette would change her ways and renounce aristocratic excesses, then the monarchy could be saved and the queen could return to the good will of the people. Despite his view that the monarchy could be restored, Hébert was skeptical of the queen's willingness to do so and often characterized her as an evil enemy of the people by referring to Queen Marie Antoinette as "Madame Veto" and even addressing King Louis XVI as  "drunken and lazy; a cuckolded pig". Initially, Hébert was trying to not only educate his readers about the Queen, but also awaken her to how she was viewed by the French public. Many of the conversations that Père Duchesne carries with her in the newspaper are attempts at either showcasing her supposed nymphomania or attempts to beg her to repent and reverse her wicked ways. With the king's failed flight to Varennes his tone significantly hardened.

At the time, many writers and journalists were greatly influenced by the proclamation of martial law on 21 October 1789. It invoked various questions and patterns of Revolutionary thinking and inspired various forms of writing such as Le Père Duchesne. The law prompted multiple interpretations all of which led to what became essential Revolutionary ideals.

In his newspaper, Le Père Duchesne, Hébert did not use himself as the prime example of the Revolution. He used a mythical character called the Père Duchesne to be able to relay his message in a more subtle way. He was already well known by the people of Paris and only wanted his message to be received directly and clearly by his followers and not his enemies. Père Duchesne was a very strong, outspoken character with extremely high emotions. He constantly felt great anger but also would experience great happiness. He was never afraid to fully display exactly how he was feeling. He would constantly use foul language and other harsh words to express himself.

Revolutionary role

Hébert agreed with most of the ideals of the radical Montagnard faction; however, he was not a member of the faction.

On 17 July 1791, Hébert was at the Champ de Mars to sign a petition to demand the removal of King Louis XVI and was caught up in the subsequent Champ de Mars massacre by troops under Lafayette. This put him in the revolutionary mindset, and the Le Père Duchesne adopted a sloppier style to better appeal to the masses.  Le Père Duchesne began to attack Lafayette, Mirabeau, and Bailly. In a 1793 speech to the public, Hébert stated his beliefs regarding Lafayette. He noted that there were two Père Duchesnes who opposed each other deeply. The Père Duchesne that he said he identified with was the "honest and loyal Père Duchesne who has pursued traitors", while the Père Duchesne he had nothing to do with "praised Lafayette to the heavens". Following Louis's failed flight to Varennes he began to attack both Louis and Pope Pius VI as well.

Hébert met his future wife Marie Goupil (born 1756), a 37-year-old former nun who had left convent life at the Sisters of Providence convent at rue Saint-Honoré. Marie's passport from this time shows regular use. They married on 7 February 1792, and had a daughter, Virginie-Scipion Hébert (7 February 1793 – 13 July 1830). During this time, Hébert had a luxurious, bourgeois life. He entertained Jean-Nicolas Pache, the mayor of Paris and Minister of War, for weeks, as well as other influential men, and liked to dress elegantly and surround himself with beautiful objects such as pretty tapestries—an attitude that can be contrasted to that of Paris Commune president Pierre Gaspard Chaumette. Where he got the financial resources to support his lifestyle is unclear; however, there are Jean-Nicolas Pache's commissions to print thousands of issues of Le Père Duchesne and his relationship to Delaunay d'Angers, mistress and wife of Andres Maria de Guzman.

As a member of Cordeliers club, he had a seat in the revolutionary Paris Commune where on 9 and 10 August 1792 he was sent to the Bonne-Nouvelle section of Paris.  As a public journalist, he supported the September Massacres. On 22 December 1792, he was appointed the second substitute of the procureur of the commune, and through to August 1793 supported the attacks against the Girondin faction.  In April–May 1793 he, along with Marat and others, violently attacked Girondins.

In February 1793, he voted with fellow bourgeois Hébertists against the Maximum Price Act, a price ceiling on grain, on the grounds it would cause hoarding and stir resentment. On 20 May 1793, the moderate majority of the National Convention formed the Special Commission of Twelve, which was designed to investigate and prosecute conspirators. At the urging of the Twelve on 24 May 1793, he was arrested.

However, Hébert had been warned in time, and, with the support of the sans-culottes, the National Convention was forced to order his release three days later.

Dechristianization

Dechristianization was a movement that took hold during the French Revolution. Advocates believed that to pursue a secular society, they had to reject the superstitions of the old regime and, as an extension, Catholicism. The trend toward secularization had already begun to take hold throughout France during the eighteenth century; however, between September 1793 and August 1794, French politicians began discussing and embracing notions of "radical dechristianization." While Robespierre advocated for the right to religion and believed that aggressively pursuing dechristianization would spur widespread revolts throughout rural France, Hébert and his followers, the Hébertists, wanted to spontaneously and violently overhaul religion. The writer and philosopher Voltaire was an inspiration to Hébert on this front. Like Voltaire, Hébert believed that the toleration of different religious beliefs was necessary for humanity to pass from an age of superstitions and that traditional religion was an obstacle to this goal. Eventually, Hébert would argue that Jesus was not a demigod, but instead a good sans-culotte. Voltaire had also provided him with the basic tenets of a civic religion that would be able to replace traditional religion, which led to Hébert to being heavily involved in the movement. The program of dechristianization waged against Catholicism, and eventually against all forms of Christianity, included the deportation of clergy and the condemnation of many of them to death, the closing of churches, the institution of revolutionary and civic cults, the large scale destruction of religious monuments, the outlawing of public and private worship and religious education, forced marriages of the clergy and forced abjurement of their priesthood. On 21 October 1793 a law was passed which made all suspected priests and all persons who harbored them liable to death on sight.

On 10 November 1793, dechristianization reached what many historians consider the climax of the movement when the Hébertists moved the first celebration of the Festival of Reason, a civic festival celebrating the goddess of Reason, from the Circus of the Palais Royale to the Cathedral of Notre Dame and reclaimed the cathedral as a "Temple of Reason." On 7 June Robespierre, who had previously condemned the Cult of Reason, advocated a new state religion and recommended that the Convention acknowledge the existence of God. On the next day, the worship of the deistic Supreme Being was inaugurated as an official aspect of the Revolution. Compared with Hébert's somewhat popular festivals, this austere new religion of Virtue was received with signs of hostility by the Parisian public.

Clash with Robespierre, arrest, conviction, and execution

After successfully attacking the Girondins, Hébert in fall of 1793 continued to attack those whom he viewed as too moderate, including Danton, Philippeaux, and Robespierre, among others. When Hébert accused Marie-Antoinette during her trial of incest with her son, Robespierre called him a fool ("imbécile") for his outrageous and unsubstantiated innuendos and lies.

The government, with support from the Jacobins, was exasperated and finally decided to strike on the night of 13 March 1794, despite the reluctance of Barère de Vieuzac, Collot d'Herbois and Billaud-Varenne. The order was to arrest the leaders of the Hébertists; these included individuals in the War Ministry and others.

In the Revolutionary Tribunal, Hébert was treated very differently from Danton, more like a thief than a conspirator; his earlier scams were brought to light and criticized. He was sentenced to death with his co-defendants on the third day of deliberations. Their execution by guillotine took place on 24 March 1794. Hébert fainted several times on the way to the guillotine and screamed hysterically when he was placed under the blade. Hébert's executioners amused the crowd by adjusting the guillotine so that its blade stopped inches above his neck, and it was only after the fourth time the lever (déclic) was pulled that he was actually beheaded. His corpse was disposed of in the Madeleine Cemetery. His widow was executed twenty days later on 13 April 1794, and her corpse was disposed of in the Errancis Cemetery.

The importance of Hébert's execution was known by everyone involved in the revolution, including the Jacobins. Saint-Just, a prominent Jacobin leader, noted that following his execution, "the revolution is frozen", demonstrating how central Hébert and his followers, the sans-culottes, were to the longevity and success of the revolution.

Influence

It is difficult completely to ascertain the extent to which Hébert's publication Le Père Duchesne impacted the outcomes of political events between 1790 and 1794. French revolutionary historians such as Jean-Paul Bertaud, Jeremy D. Popkin, and William J. Murray each investigated French Revolutionary press history and determined that while the newspapers and magazines that one read during the revolution may have influenced their political leanings, it did not necessarily create their political leanings. One's class, for example, could be a significant determinant in directing and influencing one's political decisions. Therefore, Hébert's writings certainly influenced his audience to often dramatic extent, but the sans-culottes were but one element in a complex political mix, meaning that it is difficult to determine in what ways his writing changed the political outcomes of the French Revolution. That being said, his wide readership and voice throughout the Revolution means that he was a significant public figure and Le Père Duchesne's ability to influence the general population of France was indeed notable.

Gallery

References

 The 1911 Encyclopædia Britannica, in turn, gives the following references:
Louis Duval, "Hébert chez lui", in La Révolution Française, revue d'histoire moderne et contemporaine, t. xii. and t. xiii.
D. Mater, J. R. Hibert, L'auteur du Père Duchesne avant la journée du 10 août 1792 (Bourges, Comm. Hist. du Cher, 1888).
François Victor Alphonse Aulard, Le Culte de la raison et de l'être suprême (Paris, 1892).

External links

Jacques Hébert Internet Archive on Marxists.org

1757 births
1794 deaths
Writers from Alençon
Hébertists
Jacobins
Far-left politics in France
French newspaper founders
Newspaper editors of the French Revolution
French atheism activists
French people executed by guillotine during the French Revolution
French male essayists
French radicals
Left-wing populism in France
18th-century essayists
18th-century French male writers
Critics of Christianity
18th-century French journalists